is a Japanese language word. It may refer to:

Sandaime J Soul Brothers from Exile Tribe, a Japanese musical group known colloquially as Sandaime